Lake Imatu is a lake in Estonia. It borders the Agusalu Nature Reserve.

See also
List of lakes of Estonia

References 

Imatu
Alutaguse Parish
Imatu